Shababnikim is an Israeli comedy television series that aired on HOT in 2017. The show includes 12 30-minute episodes on lives of four Haredi Jewish men. In January 2021, the first season began streaming internationally with English subtitles under the title The New Black.

It is named after the Hebrew term shababnik.

A second season aired in North America in 2022 and a third season is in the works.

Awards 
The show was nominated for awards in eight categories by the Israeli Television Academy, winning four, including Best Comedy, Best Comedy Script, and Best Comedy Actor.

See also 
 The Chosen (1981)

References 

Haredi Judaism in Israel
Orthodox Judaism in fiction
2017 Israeli television series debuts
Israeli comedy television series
Television series about Jews and Judaism